Ahkal Moʼ Nahb I, also known as Chaacal and Akul Anab I, (July 5, 465 – November 29, 524), was an ajaw of the Maya city of Palenque. He ruled from June 5, 501 AD to his death.

Family 
Ahkal Moʼ Nahb I is the earliest recorded ruler of Palenque whose exact dates of birth, accession and death have been verified. He was possibly the younger brother of his immediate predecessor, Bʼutz Aj Sak Chiik. For unknown reasons Ahkal Moʼ Nahbʼ is mentioned several times in official narratives left by Pacal the Great, who ruled Palenque a century later. It is believed Pacal considered Ahkal Moʼ Naabʼ I a particularly important historical figure or his ancestor.

Notes

Sources 

465 births
524 deaths
Rulers of Palenque
6th-century monarchs in North America
6th century in the Maya civilization